The 1982 Lliga Catalana de Bàsquet was the third edition of the Catalan Basketball League. As a novelty, there was a change in the competition system, dividing into two groups and also for the first time appeared a team of a lower category (Español), since there were only 5 Catalan teams in the first division. The title was won again by FC Barcelona, with an easily winning against the FIBA Korać Cup champions Joventut Fichet in a newly filled Palau dels Esports. Also for the first time, and as a novelty at that time, Josep Maria Margall was awarded the best player in the competition, who was also the absolute maximum scorer of the competition with 105 points (21 points per game).

Group stage

Group A

Group B

Final

References

Lliga Catalana de Bàsquet seasons
 
Spanish